The 1954–55 Israeli Basketball League season was the 2nd season of top division basketball in Israel. The league was played over regular season only, with the top placed team winning the championship.

Standings 

Source: Hadshot HaSport, 11 December 1955, p. 2
Pts=Points, P=Matches played, W=Matches won, L=Matches lost, F=Points for, A=Points against, D=Points difference.

1954–55 in Israeli basketball
Israeli Basketball Premier League seasons